Nicholas Gilkes (born 16 May 2005) is a British-Canadian racing driver currently competing in the GB3 Championship for Hillspeed. He is the 2021 Ontario F1600 and Canadian F1600 champion respectively.

Career

Karting 
Having started racing in Barbados, Gilkes moved into serious competition once he and his family moved back to Canada. There he took the Goodwood Kartways Novice Club title in 2016 and became Pfaff Kartsport Cup winner two years later. Gilkes' tenure in the United States' karting scene turned out to bear fruit, with second place at the US Grand Nationals. In 2020, his final year of karting, Gilkes also won the Canadian KartStars Championship.

Formula Ford 
Gilkes made his single-seater debut in 2021, competing in the Ontario and Canadian F1600 Championships for Britain West Motorsport. The Canadian experienced two dominant campaigns and took both titles, therefore becoming the youngest ever Ontario F1600 champion.

Before the end of the year Gilkes made his first racing appearance in Britain. Driving for Kevin Mills Racing he would compete in the Walter Hayes Trophy, where he finished 20th, and the Formula Ford Festival, where he collided with his sister in the semi-final heat.

GB3 Championship 
Following a test at Silverstone Gilkes was announced to be signing for Hillspeed to compete in the GB3 Championship in 2022. Having qualified 17th in both qualifying sessions at the first round at Oulton Park, Gilkes finished 16th and 18th in races 1 and 2. Due to the reverse grid format the Canadian was able to start from third place in the final race of the weekend. He would end up missing out on the podium after being overtaken by David Morales in the closing stages of the race. At the following round at the Silverstone Circuit, the Canadian would score his first podium in the series, profiting from a quick getaway at the start to overtake two competitors and closely battling Cian Shields for the victory in the final laps. Round three at Donington Park would start out in disappointing fashion however, as a suspension issue in qualifying meant that Gilkes was forced to start from last place in all three races. A collision with David Morales in Race 1 compounded matters, as it led to the Canadian's first retirement of the season. He would come back fighting in the third race, overtaking ten cars to finish twelfth. A then-best qualifying performance of 13th at Snetterton Circuit, which he described as "a fairly decent result", would be cancelled out by a car failure which prevented Gilkes from starting Race 1.

After the summer break Gilkes would qualify twelfth at Spa-Francorchamps and, for the first time that season, finished twelfth or better in each race despite a lack of experience at the circuit compared to his rivals, with a fifth place in the reversed-grid race capping off his weekend. During the following event at Silverstone, the Canadian became embroiled in a fight for the podium, however he would spin out on a damp part of the track after an overtake attempt on Zak Taylor. An anonymous weekend followed, as Gilkes finished outside of the top 15 in the main races. Gilkes concluded his season in perfect fashion however, winning the final race of the campaign at Donington Park, having managed to lead from start to finish. He ended up 14th in the standings with 165.5 points.

Personal life 
Nick is the younger brother of Megan Gilkes, who is currently competing in F1 Academy.

Racing record

Racing career summary 

* Season still in progress.

Complete Ontario F1600 Championship results 
(key) (Races in bold indicate pole position) (Races in italics indicate fastest lap)

Complete GB3 Championship results 
(key) (Races in bold indicate pole position) (Races in italics indicate fastest lap)

Complete Eurocup-3 results

References

External links 

2005 births
Living people
Canadian people of British descent
Canadian racing drivers
BRDC British Formula 3 Championship drivers
Sportspeople from Richmond Hill, Ontario
Drivex drivers